Kirkdale is a Liverpool City Council Ward in the Liverpool Riverside Parliamentary constituency. Its original incarnation as a ward was from 1895 to 1952. It was reincarnated for the 2004 Municipal elections from most of the former Vauxhall and Melrose wards and a small part of Everton ward.

Councillors
The ward returned seven councillors.

 indicates seat up for re-election after boundary changes.

 indicates seat up for re-election.

 indicates change in affiliation.

 indicates seat up for re-election after casual vacancy.

Election results

Elections of the 2020s

Caused by the resignation of Malcolm Kennedy who had been resident in Spain for the previous 18 months

Elections of the 2010s

Elections of the 2000s
Two councillors were returned in the 2008 election.

After the boundary change of 2004 the whole of Liverpool City Council faced election. Three Councillors were returned.

• italics denotes the sitting Councillor
• bold denotes the winning candidate

See also
 Liverpool City Council
 Liverpool City Council elections 1880–present
 Liverpool Town Council elections 1835 - 1879

References

External links
 Liverpool City Council: Ward profile

Wards of Liverpool